Vivian Wu ( Wu Junmei; ; born February 5, 1966) is a Chinese-American actress. Her big break came in 1987, appearing in the biographical film The Last Emperor. She later went to starring in films Iron & Silk (1990), The Guyver (1991), Heaven & Earth (1993), Teenage Mutant Ninja Turtles III (1993), The Joy Luck Club (1993), and most notably playing the leading roles in The Pillow Book (1996) and The Soong Sisters (1997). In 2020, she stars as Dr. Lu Wang in the Netflix science fiction drama Away.

Early life
Wu Junmei was born in Shanghai, China. Wu is the daughter of Zhu Manfang, one of the leading actresses in China during the 1940s and 1950s. She attended Shanghai Shixi High School and began acting at the age of 16 in Shanghai Film Studio. In 1987, she attended the Hawaii Pacific University, studying tourism.

Career
In 1985, Wu, aged 18, was given an audition for the role of Wenxiu in Bernardo Bertolucci's 1987 film The Last Emperor. Six months later, she was chosen for the role, making her big screen debut. Wu later went on to star in the drama film Shadow of China (1989), directed and co-written by Mitsuo Yanagimachi, followed by the action comedy Iron & Silk (1990). The following year, she appeared in the poorly received  superhero comedy film The Guyver with Mark Hamill. She was chosen by People as one of The 50 Most Beautiful People in the World in 1990.

Wu gained some critical acclaim after appearing in The Joy Luck Club (1993) directed by Wayne Wang, and playing the leading role in the erotic drama film The Pillow Book (1996). Wu also played Mitsu in the 1993 film Teenage Mutant Ninja Turtles III. She played historical figure of Soong Mei-ling in the 1997 historical drama film The Soong Sisters, and The Founding of a Republic (2009) and well as on 2011 television series Departed Heroes.

Beside films, Wu has also worked in television, making guest appearances in shows, such as The Untouchables, L.A. Law, Tales from the Crypt, Highlander: The Series, JAG, Murder, She Wrote, F/X: The Series, ER, and Ghost Whisperer. She also starred in the live action video game Supreme Warrior (1994). As May–Lin Eng in Eve and the Fire Horse (2005), Wu received a Genie Award nomination. She also appeared in the video game Indiana Jones and the Emperor's Tomb as Mei Ying. She is one of the original four judges of Hunan TV's Worlds's Got Talent.

In 2020, Wu made her return to Hollywood productions after nearly 25 years, with a starring role as Chinese astronaut Lu Wang, in the Netflix science fiction drama Away opposite Hilary Swank.

Personal life
Wu married Cuban-born American director and producer Oscar Luis Costo in 1994. She later became a United States citizen.

Filmography

Film
 The Last Emperor (1987)
 Iron & Silk (1990)
 Shadow of China (1990)
 The Guyver (1991)
 Heaven & Earth (1993)
 Teenage Mutant Ninja Turtles III (1993)
 The Joy Luck Club (1993)
 Vanishing Son (TV) (1994)
 Woman Rose (1996)
 The Pillow Book (1996)
 The Soong Sisters (1997)
 A Bright Shining Lie (1998) (TV Film)
 The Legend of Pig Eye (1998)
 Blindness (1998)
 8½ Women (1999)
 Dinner Rush (2000)
 Roses Are Red (2000)
 Red Skies (2002)
 Encrypt (2003)
 Beauty Remains (2005)
 Kinamand (2005)
 Eve and the Fire Horse (2005)
 Shanghai Red (2006)
 Desires of the Heart (2008)
 The Founding of a Republic (2009)
 Shanghai Blue (2010)
 Snow Flower and the Secret Fan (2011)
 The Story of a Piano (2011)
 Departed Heroes (2011)
 To Forgive (2012)
 Judge Zhan (2012)
 The Palace (2013)
 Feed Me (2013)
 Who is Undercover (2014)
 Perfect Couple (2014)
 The Queens (2015)
 Go Lala Go 2 (2015)
 Everybody's Fine (2016)
 Youth Dinner (2017)
 The Chinese Widow (2017)
 Father and Son (2017)
 Cry Me a Sad River (2018)
 Knockout (2019)
 Dead Pigs (2019)

TV series 
 Millennium "Siren" (1998)
 Dwelling Narrowness (2009)
 Strange World  (1999 - 2000)
 Highlander: The Series (1994) May-ling Shen
 Secret Agent Man (2000) "Uncle SAM" Ling #1
 JAG  “Deja Vu” (1995) Angelique Sonsiri
 Tales from the Crypt "Comes the Dawn" (1995) Jeri Drumbeater
 Murder She Wrote "Kendo Killing" (4 Jan 1996) Miko Ishida
 The First Half of My Life (2017)
 Ruyi's Royal Love in the Palace (2018)
 Qin Dynasty Epic (2019)
 Away (2020)
 Station 19 (2021)
 Irma Vep (2022)

Video games 
 Supreme Warrior (1995)
 Indiana Jones and the Emperor's Tomb (2003)

References

External links

1966 births
Living people
Naturalized citizens of the United States
Actresses from Shanghai
Chinese expatriates in the United States
Chinese television actresses
Chinese film actresses
20th-century Chinese actresses
21st-century Chinese actresses